The Geological Society of America Bulletin (until 1960 called The Bulletin of the Geological Society of America and also commonly referred to as GSA Bulletin) is a peer-reviewed scientific journal that has been published by the Geological Society of America since 1890. Its first editor was William John McGee. According to the Journal Citation Reports, the journal has a 2016 impact factor of 4.212.

See also
List of scientific journals in earth and atmospheric sciences

References

External links

Geological Society of America
English-language journals
Geology journals
Bimonthly journals